Jake Drew (born March 12, 2000) is an American professional stock car racing driver. He last competed full-time in the ARCA Menards Series West, driving the No. 6 Ford Fusion for Sunrise Ford Racing, and part-time in the ARCA Menards Series, driving the No. 6 Ford Fusion for the seam team. He is the 2022 ARCA Menards Series West champion.

Racing career

ARCA Menards Series West 
Drew made his ARCA Menards Series West debut in 2021, running full time for Sunrise Ford Racing. Drew had a phenomenal year, collecting 7 top-tens, 4 top-fives, and 3 pole awards. Drew finished a best of second place at Irwindale Speedway and the Las Vegas Motor Speedway Bullring. Drew was tied for the championship with Jesse Love, however, Love won the tiebreaker, placing Drew second in the standings.

Drew returned to Sunrise Ford for another full time season in 2022, this time driving the No. 6 car. Drew would have a breakout season, earning four wins, nine top fives, and ten top tens, eventually winning the championship.

After SFR suspended their ARCA West operations after the season, Drew was unable to find a full-time ride for 2023.

ARCA Menards Series 
Drew made his ARCA Menards Series debut, running in the race's paired event with the West Series at the Phoenix Raceway. Drew finished 18th.

Motorsports career results

ARCA Menards Series

ARCA Menards Series West

References

External links 
 

2000 births
Living people
ARCA Menards Series drivers
NASCAR drivers
Racing drivers from California
Sportspeople from Fullerton, California